A test point is a location within an electronic circuit that is used to either monitor the state of the circuitry or to inject test signals. Test points have two primary uses:

 During manufacturing they are used to verify that a newly assembled device is working correctly. Any equipment that fails this testing is either discarded or sent to a rework station to attempt to repair the manufacturing defects.
 After sale of the device to a customer, test points may be used at a later time to repair the device if it malfunctions, or if the device needs to be re-calibrated after having components replaced.

Test points can be labelled and may include pins for attachment of alligator clips or may have complete connectors for test clips.

Modern miniature surface-mount electronics often simply have a row of unlabelled, tinned solder pads. The device is placed into a test fixture that holds the device securely, and a special surface-contact connector plate is pressed down onto the solder pads to connect them all as a group.

Electronics manufacturing